François Dubourdeau (born 4 December 1980 in Angoulême, Charente) is a French footballer who completed his career by playing for Cincinnati Kings in the USL Second Division. His previous clubs include Motherwell, Kilmarnock, Dundee, Forfar Athletic and Accrington Stanley.

Dubourdeau was a fans-favourite at Motherwell after he starred in a 1–0 victory against Rangers. Despite this, Dubourdeau was released in May 2003 by manager Terry Butcher. In August of the same year, Dubourdeau was signed by fellow Scottish Premier League side Kilmarnock.

References

External links

 http://carsonnewmaneagles.cstv.com/sports/m-soccer/mtt/dubourdeau_francois00.html

1980 births
Living people
People from Angoulême
French footballers
French expatriate footballers
Angoulême Charente FC players
Scottish Premier League players
Accrington Stanley F.C. players
Motherwell F.C. players
Kilmarnock F.C. players
Dundee F.C. players
Forfar Athletic F.C. players
Southport F.C. players
USL Second Division players
Cincinnati Kings players
Association football goalkeepers
Expatriate footballers in Scotland
Sportspeople from Charente
Footballers from Nouvelle-Aquitaine